Clermont County, popularly called Clermont, is a county in the U.S. state of Ohio. As of the 2020 census, the population was 208,601. Ordinanced in 1800 as part of the Virginia Military District, Clermont is Ohio's eighth oldest county, the furthest county west in Appalachian Ohio, and the eleventh oldest county of the former Northwest Territory. Clermont County is part of the Cincinnati, OH-KY-IN Metropolitan Statistical Area. 
The county is named from the French "clear hills or mountain."
Its county seat is Batavia, while its largest city is Milford.

History
Clermont's name is borrowed from a prefecture in France notable as the home of Celtic leader Vercingetorix who led the unified Gallic resistance to Roman invasion.  Clermont connotes "clear mountain," which describes the hills when viewed through the thick Ohio River fog. During the Age of Discovery, the French became the first recorded Europeans to see this land from the Ohio River, though Clermont's peoplification dates to the Paleoindian, Adena, Hopewell, and Fort Ancient cultures.  The Gatch Site and other sites provide glimpses into what life was like for these people.  The Shawnee, Miami, Lenape, Mingo, Odawa, Cherokee, and Wyandot each have or had a presence in Clermont.

At its ordinance in 1800 by the Commonwealth of Virginia to reward Virginian military veterans with land bounties, Clermont encompassed twenty-three current Ohio counties and over 4.2 million acres of dense old-growth forest.  The first deed was issued on February 20, 1796.  George Washington owned three parcels of land in Clermont County, whose first capital was Williamsburg, founded by William Lytle, and like Milford, was founded in 1796.  A stone dairy house, constructed in 1800, is thought to be the oldest standing building in Clermont.  The edifice is located beside Harmony Hill on South Third Street in Williamsburg.  Harmony Hill, one of the area's first farms, was built by William Lytle. The last American Indian village was located two miles south of Marathon in Jackson Township, along the mouth of Grassy Run on the East Fork of the Little Miami River.  The site saw the largest frontier battle in Clermont, the Battle of Grassy Run, during which pioneer Simon Kenton clashed with chief Tecumseh on April 10, 1792.  The Wyandot lived at this site until 1811.  The Bullskin Trail, once a major American Indian trail, runs north and south through Clermont along Ohio Route 133, and was used by frontiersmen Kenton and Daniel Boone on hunting and warfare expeditions. In 1823, New Richmond became the seat, and in 1824, the seat moved to Batavia, the county's current seat.  Clermont's Moscow became the exiled home of French royalty during the early 1800s, including future King of France Louis-Philippe in 1815 and the Marquis de Lafayette in 1825. Point Pleasant was birthplace and boyhood home of military hero, Union general, and President Ulysses S. Grant, born on April 27, 1822.

During the 1800s, antislavery sentiment remained strong.  Bethel was the residence of Democratic United States Senator Thomas Morris who also served three terms in the Ohio House of Representatives, as Ohio Supreme Court Justice, and four terms in the Ohio Senate.  His U.S. Senate career lasted from 1833 to 1839, and in 1844, Morris was the vice presidential candidate for a third party with the goal of abolishing slavery—approximately sixteen years before the first antislavery Republican president.  Also in 1844, Clermont became the site of Utopia, an egalitarian haven of Puritans who espoused the doctrines of François Marie Charles Fourier. In 1847, future Ohio Governor John M. Pattison was born near Owensville.  Grant became commander-in-chief of the U.S. Army in the Civil War, during which John Hunt Morgan and his Confederate raiders invaded Clermont in 1863.  Grant was elected the eighteenth president in 1868.

Clermont's last-standing covered bridge was built in 1878 on Stonelick Williams Corner Road, near US Route 50; it was renovated in 2014. The Grant birthplace, originally a one-room cabin, continues to welcome visitors and in 1890 was removed from its original location, travelling by boat to be viewed by citizens along various waterways.  It was also taken to the 1893 Chicago World's Fair before returning to Clermont.

An unverified urban legend speculates that, around year 1900, clergy from numerous congregations gathered to create a list of ten places on Earth where the Garden of Eden could have been located.  Among the locations was Clermont County, Ohio, listed for its many fruiting trees and the early influence of American Indians who built earthen mounds in the form of serpents.  Subsequently, prominent men from Hamilton County dedicated Eden Park to honor the distinction.

Pattison became the first Clermont Countian elected Governor of Ohio in 1905, Ohio's first Democratic governor of the twentieth century.  Pattison lived in Milford, and at a time before the influence of Columbus, governed from his home called the Promont, which was used as the official governor's residence.  The mansion, completed in 1865, today is a museum that houses a library and other historical memorabilia.  It is located at 906 Main Street, Milford. Democrat Hugh Llewellyn Nichols of Batavia served as 32nd Lieutenant Governor of Ohio and became the first Chief Justice of the Ohio Supreme Court in 1914.  Orpha Gatch of Milford, the first woman elected to its school board, locally sponsored the county LWV, and is the namesake for the club's award given annually at its suffragist brunch honoring the recognized volunteerism and leadership qualities. Clermont's progressivism created a climate of political independence.  Despite recent Republican prevalence in its offices, heavy nonpartisan and union influences exist.  Clermont's growing population as well as environmentalism have contributed to this climate.

Geography

Adjacent counties

Brown County (east)
Bracken County, Kentucky (south)
Pendleton County, Kentucky (southwest)
Campbell County, Kentucky (southwest)
Hamilton County (west)
Warren County (north)
Clinton County (north east)

Demographics

2010 census
As of the census of 2010, there were 197,363 people, 74,828 households, and 53,800 families residing in the county. The racial makeup of the county was 95.9% white, 1.2% black or African American, 1.0% Asian, 0.2% American Indian, 0.4% from other races, and 1.3% from two or more races. Those of Hispanic or Latino origin made up 1.5% of the population. In terms of ancestry, 34.0% were German, 18.1% were Irish, 12.0% were American, and 11.1% were English.

Of the 74,828 households, 35.9% had children under the age of 18 living with them, 56.1% were married couples living together, 10.9% had a female householder with no husband present, 28.1% were non-families, and 22.5% of all households were made up of individuals. The average household size was 2.61 and the average family size was 3.06. The median age was 38.5 years.

The median income for a household in the county was $58,472 and the median income for a family was $68,485. Males had a median income of $50,204 versus $36,746 for females. The per capita income for the county was $27,900. About 6.9% of families and 9.3% of the population were below the poverty line, including 12.6% of those under age 18 and 5.5% of those age 65 or over.

2000 census
As of the census of 2000, there were 177,977 people, 66,013 households, and 49,047 families residing in the county. The racial makeup of the county was 97.13% White, 0.91% African American, 0.19% Native American, 0.63% Asian, 0.02% Pacific Islander, 0.26% from other races, and 0.86% from two or more races. 0.87% of the population were Hispanic or Latino of any race. 32.7% were of German, 16.7% American, 12.0% Irish and 11.0% English ancestry.

There were 66,013 households, out of which 38.10% had children under the age of 18 living with them, 60.40% were married couples living together, 10.00% had a female householder with no husband present, and 25.70% were non-families. 21.00% of all households were made up of individuals, and 7.00% had someone living alone who was 65 years of age or older. The average household size was 2.67 and the average family size was 3.11.

In the county the population was spread out, with 27.90% under the age of 18, 8.40% from 18 to 24, 31.70% from 25 to 44, 22.60% from 45 to 64, and 9.40% who were 65 years of age or older. The median age was 35 years. For every 100 females there were 96.40 males. For every 100 females age 18 and over, there were 93.60 males.

The median income for a household in the county was $49,386, and the median income for a family was $57,032. Males had a median income of $40,739 versus $27,613 for females. The per capita income for the county was $22,370. About 5.30% of families and 7.10% of the population were below the poverty line, including 8.70% of those under age 18 and 7.90% of those age 65 or over.

Economy
Aviation is served by the Clermont County Airport.  Clermont's newspapers are the Clermont Sun, positing historical stories and statistics, and the  Community Press papers.  According to the county's 2019 Comprehensive Annual Financial Report, the top employers in the county are:

Education

Colleges and high schools in Clermont
These buildings may not have been high schools when they were first constructed, but have since become high schools.  The building years listed connote the current buildings' initial openings and do not include renovations or additions.
(1957) Clermont Northeastern High School, 5327 Hutchinson Road, Batavia
(1963) Milford High School, One Eagles Way, Milford
(1965) New Richmond High School, 1131 Bethel-New Richmond Road, New Richmond
(1972) Clermont College, 4200 Clermont College Drive, Batavia
(1996) Williamsburg High School, 500 South Fifth Street, Williamsburg
(1997) Batavia High School, One Bulldog Place, Batavia
(2002) Bethel-Tate High School, 3420 Ohio Rt. 125, Bethel
(2002) Goshen High School, 6707 Goshen Road, Goshen
(2004) Felicity-Franklin High School, 105 Market Street, Felicity
(2017) West Clermont High School, 4101 Bach Buxton Rd, Cincinnati,

Parks and libraries
Clermont County has the Cincinnati Nature Center at Rowe Woods and Valley View Nature Preserve, both in Milford, and oversees five parks, three nature preserves, a hiking/biking trail, and several green spaces, encompassing over six-hundred acres. Clermont is the location of East Fork State Park and Stonelick State Park, and benefits from the Clermont Public Libraries.

Politics
All of Clermont's elected officeholders, including judges, are members of the Republican Party.

U.S. House of Representatives

Clermont's congressional seat is occupied by Brad Wenstrup, who resides in Cincinnati, Hamilton County, Ohio.

Elected Commission

The three seats of the Clermont Commission are occupied by Edwin Humphrey, last elected 2016; David Painter, last elected 2016; and Claire B. Corcoran.  The commission employs an administrator, Thomas Eigel (as of 2020), to run day-to-day operations of Clermont.

Ohio Statehouse

Encompassing all of Clermont, the 14th Ohio Senate seat is occupied by Terry Johnson, last elected 2020. Covering northern Clermont, the 65th statehouse seat is occupied by Jean Schmidt, last elected 2020. Covering southern Clermont, the 66th statehouse seat is occupied by Adam Bird, last elected 2020.

Elected Officers
Clermont's elected officers include Debbie Clepper, Recorder; Mark J. Tekulve, Prosecutor; Linda Fraley, Auditor; Robert S. Leahy, Sheriff; Pat Manger, Engineer; Tim Rudd, Municipal Clerk of Courts; Brian Treon, Coroner; Jeannie Zurmehly, Treasurer; and Barbara Wiedenbein, Clerk of Courts.

Elected Judges
The elected Common Pleas Court is occupied by Judge Richard Ferenc, Judge Victor Haddad, Judge Anthony W. Brock, and Judge Jerry McBride. The elected Common Pleas Domestic Relations Court is occupied by Judge Kathleen M. Rodenberg. The elected Municipal Court is occupied by Judge Jesse Kramig, Judge Kevin T. Miles, and Judge Jason E. Nagel. The elected Probate/Juvenile Court is occupied by Judge James A. Shriver.

National outcomes
Prior to 1912, Clermont County voted for Democratic candidates in presidential elections, only voting Republican three times between 1856 and 1912. The county was a bellwether from 1912 to 1936. But starting with the 1940 election, it has become more Republican-leaning, with Lyndon B. Johnson being the lone Democrat to win since. Clermont has been visited by recent national ticket candidates from Republicans and Democrats.

|}

Communities
Ohio recognizes municipalities (villages and cities) and townships.  

Each municipality has an elected-nonpartisan council with a designated mayor.  Mayors sometimes preside during mayor's court and have various other roles.  These mayor-council arrangements pass municipal ordinances.

In 1991, the state legislature and George Voinovich adopted "Limited Home Rule Townships" as a schism from the Ohio Constitution's Municipal Home Rule established in 1912. The alteration devolved township government to be similar to municipalities but without full home rule, a city code, comprehensive zoning, among a host of other traits.  The result is many developed townships which would have sought shared municipal incorporation with cities or villages have not maximized property value and do not have basic support for services and infrastructure, relying exclusively on reduced state funding—much of which comes from federal investments for roadwork.  The autonomy which was sought has effectively been unable to reserve responsibility for the community and instead outsourced that responsibility to state intervention.

Cities
Loveland (partly in Hamilton and Warren Counties)
Milford (partly in Hamilton County)

Villages

Batavia (county seat)
Bethel
Chilo
Felicity
Moscow
Neville
New Richmond
Owensville
Williamsburg

Dissolved villages

Amelia
Newtonsville

Townships

Batavia
Franklin
Goshen
Jackson
Miami
Monroe
Ohio
Pierce
Stonelick
Tate
Union
Washington
Wayne
Williamsburg

https://web.archive.org/web/20160715023447/http://www.ohiotownships.org/township-websites

Census-designated places

Day Heights
Goshen
Miamiville
Mount Carmel
Mount Repose
Mulberry
Summerside
Withamsville

Unincorporated communities

Afton
Amelia
Bantam
Belfast
Blairsville
Blowville
Branch Hill
Braziers
Cedron
Clermontville
Clover
Concord
Edenton
Elk Lick
Glen Este
Grailville
Hamlet
Hennings Mill
Hills
Laurel
Lerado
Lindale
Locust Corner
Maple
Marathon
Milford Hills 
Modest
Monterey
Moores Fork
Mount Holly
Mount Olive
Mount Pisgah
New Palestine
Ninemile
Nineveh
Nicholsville
Olive Branch
Perintown
Point Isabel
Point Pleasant
Pringle Corner
Round Bottom
Rural
Saltair
Simpkinsville
Shiloh
Springvale 
Stonelick
Tobasco
Utopia
Wards Corner
Wiggonsville
Williams Corner
Willowville
Woodville

Gallery

See also

National Register of Historic Places listings in Clermont County, Ohio

References

External links
Clermont County Clerk of Courts Public Records
Clermont County Government

 
Appalachian Ohio
Counties of Appalachia
Ohio counties on the Ohio River
1800 establishments in the Northwest Territory
Populated places established in 1800